Henry Sommerville (7 July 1928 – 6 October 2010) was an Australian fencer. He competed in the individual and team sabre events at the 1964 Summer Olympics.

References

1928 births
2010 deaths
Australian male fencers
Olympic fencers of Australia
Fencers at the 1964 Summer Olympics